Allen's chipmunk (Neotamias senex) is a species of chipmunk. It is also known as the shadow chipmunk. It is native to the western United States, where it occurs in California, Nevada, and Oregon. It is a common species of the Sierra Nevada. Neotamias senex's length measures about 229-261 mm. Female chipmunks are larger compared to males, with a dimorphism ratio of 1.033. Females weigh around 73.0 grams to 108.5 grams, while males weigh 66.8 grams to 99.3 grams.

This chipmunk generally prefers mature coniferous forests and chaparral slopes dominated by ponderosa pine, Jeffrey pine, sugar pine, black oak, Douglas fir, white fir, red fir, incense cedar, and mountain hemlock. The shrub layer includes buckbrush, manzanita, blackberry, and chinquapin. A study in the Sierra Nevada found that Allen's chipmunk was more abundant in red fir than in mixed conifer woodland.

Like other chipmunks, Allen's chipmunk is omnivorous. Their diet consists largely of vegetation: mushrooms, berries, nuts, shoots, seeds and grains. But chipmunks also eat other animals, including insects, frogs, bird eggs and occasionally baby birds. They are in turn prey for minks, weasels, and owls. Allen's chipmunk is active all year round except during stretches of harsh winter weather.

References

Further reading
Thorington, R. W. Jr. and R. S. Hoffman. 2005. Family Sciuridae.  pp. 754–818 in Mammal Species of the World: A Taxonomic and Geographic Reference. D. E. Wilson and D. M. Reeder, eds. Johns Hopkins University Press, Baltimore.

Neotamias
Fauna of California
Fauna of the Sierra Nevada (United States)
Biota of Oregon
Natural history of Nevada
Mammals of the United States
Mammals described in 1890
Taxonomy articles created by Polbot